S. bidentata may refer to:

 Scaphyglottis bidentata, an orchid of the Americas
 Stelis bidentata, an orchid first described in 1912
 Styringomyia bidentata, a crane fly
 Succisa bidentata, a flowering plant